Franz Daniel Kahn  (1926–1998) was a mathematician and astrophysicist at the University of Manchester. He was Professor of Astronomy from 1966 to 1993, then Emeritus thereafter in the School of Physics and Astronomy.

Education 
Kahn was educated at St Paul's School, London from 1940 to 1944, after which he secured an open scholarship to The Queen's College, Oxford. After graduating with first-class honours in mathematics in 1947 he moved to Balliol College, Oxford in 1948 as a Skynner senior student. He was awarded a Doctor of Philosophy degree in 1950 for research supervised by Sydney Chapman on the luminosity of the upper atmosphere.

Research and career
According to his certificate of election as a Fellow of the Royal Society:

Awards and honours 
Kahn was elected a Fellow of the Royal Society (FRS) in 1993. He was also a Fellow of the Royal Astronomical Society (FRAS). In 1991 the International Astronomers Union named the asteroid Kahnia after him.

Personal life
Kahn married Carla Copeland (Carla Kahn) in 1951 and had four children. Kahn died of a heart attack in Bourne End, Buckinghamshire, on 8 February 1998 and was buried in the Jewish cemetery in south Manchester. He was survived by his four children.

References 

1926 births
1998 deaths
Jewish emigrants from Nazi Germany to the United Kingdom
People educated at St Paul's School, London
Alumni of Balliol College, Oxford
Alumni of The Queen's College, Oxford
Fellows of the Royal Society
Fellows of the Royal Astronomical Society
Alumni of the University of Oxford
Academics of the University of Manchester
British astrophysicists